Rang Jaun Tere Rang Mein is an Indian Hindi television show that was aired on Dangal TV. It premiered on 3 January 2022, under the banner of Film Farm India. It stars Megha Ray, Angad Hasija and Karam Rajpal ,  Ketaki Kadam in lead roles.

Plot 
Dhani Chaubey, who lives with her family at Lucknow at Uttar Pradesh, she had an elder sister named Srishti Chaubey. The two sisters lived happily with their family. Where other side Kashinath Pandey, a famous electronic merchant and a businessman who lives at the city. He had a son named Dhruv Pandey. Who lives at the city with their own parents at Lucknow. Dhruv's family announces his son's wedding and they meet Srishti. Dhani and her family agrees their wedding and later Dhaani creates problems, which creates problems that the family thinks maybe Shristi will be same like Dhaani that's why they rejected Shristi without meeting her.

Later, upon Dhaani's plea, they accept Shristi and fix the marriage again and the wedding preparations began. But Srishti receives an electric shock and becomes unconscious, and her parents are unaware of her whereabouts and claim she has eloped because of a misunderstanding created by Dhaani which is why out of shame they replace Srishti and bring Dhani as a bride and later Dhruv marries Dhani thinking that he is marrying to Srishti. But Dhruv sees that he is married to Dhani not Srishti so only he becomes mad at her and later dislikes her, thinking that she replaces Srishti. Later, Shristi's parents realize that Shristi had been shocked and unconscious and it's too late that's why they hid the secret of Dhaani's marriage to Dhruv from Shristi, which makes Shristi curious who has just recovered from the shock and is left paralyzed and she wants to know where is Dhaani. After Dhaani, coming to his home Dhruv's mother Rupa, Dhruv's aunt also dislikes Dhani. But, his father Kashinath Pandey and Dhruv's brother Abhishek Pandey also like her and support her. Meanwhile, Srishti becomes adamant to meet Dhruv but they try to change the topic everytime she questions her family. To find the truth, she meets Dhruv's home but he is not there.

On the other hand, Dhruv agrees a deal with Dhaani, that in thirty days if she doesn't win her parents and his heart she will be out of the house. On Holi day, when Dhruv finally falls for Dhaani, Shristi comes and she confronts Dhruv about marrying Dhaani, when she was left unconscious without anyone coming to look for her and after she learns of their marriage Srishti creates many problems inside the family by getting married to Dhruv's photo and she tries to separate Dhani from Dhruv but fails. With the help of Rupa and Dhruv's aunt Srishti throws her into a pond but Dhruv saves her. Dhruv is arrested for murder. The police inspector with the help of Shristi because the police inspector's daughter was in love with Abhishek and because he had rejected her while being married to Pooja she tried kill herself and that's the reason why the police inspector was trying to help Shristi to retaliate against Pandeys, and they tried to separate Dhani from Dhruv but failed. Srishti tries to create more trouble for them by feigning a change of heart but her plans fail and ends up almost marrying Dhruv by doing Black Magic and to avoid capture she drowns herself in the pond only to be rescued by Rocky Pandey, who was the Pandey's real son and because he was kidnapped, Kashinath Pandey had adopted Dhruv without Rupa knowing. With the help of Rocky she expels Dhruv and Dhaani from the house as Srishti turns Rocky's against Dhruv's family and Dhruv. Dhani and Dhruv leave the house buy giving the name of his property of the house.

However, Dhani and Dhruv get the entire property of the house by pretending a South Indian business couple and they sign the property papers but Srishti knows about this and stops them. But later, Rocky knows his real mistake and he forgives his mother and father and they accept Shristi because she again pretends to have a change of heart. But later, Rocky was killed by Srishti on the wedding day and Dhani confesses Srishti's crime in front of their family. Srishti's mother also learns of this and tries to kill Srishti. But it was stopped by Dhani as Shristi reveals to be pregnant with Rocky's child. Later, Dhani learns that she is pregnant, Dhaani tries to uncover that Shristi is not actually pregnant but fails, the family tries to celebrate Dhaani's baby shower.

Srishti plans to kill Dhani's child and Dhani discovers this and tries to tell Dhruv but later she is hit by a car in front of Dhruv which makes Dhani unconscious. Three days later, Dhani regains consciousness and she learns that she has had a miscarriage. Dhruv blames her for his child's death, so Dhani leaves the house forever and promises to reveal the truth to the family.

1 year later 
Dhani, is now works at a temple and she still loves Dhruv while another side Dhruv, who is now a alcoholic, hates Dhani and dislikes her for the child's death. Dhani and Dhruv meet, but Dhruv misunderstands that Dhani was the one who files against on him by police for the car accident. Dhani cames to their house but Dhruv kicks her and she was saved by Kashinath while Srishti falls for Dhruv and she uses him to turn against on Dhani. And then, Srishti brings the video and Making him to watching the video of Dhani for trying to murdering her mother it is revealed that it was not Dhani but it is Srishti who records their video on her phone and she morphed her face by replacing Dhani's face which makes him to believe that Dhani is trying to murdering Srishti's family. Unaware of that truth, Dhruv divorces Dhani and he brings Srishti and marries her for Srishti's safety and blames Dhani for trying to murder and separated her and the entire family and becomes happy for their marriage and Dhruv expels Dhani from the house.

Srishti, with a help of a woman named Meera kidnaps both Dhani and Kashinath which was witnessed by Pooja and Pooja tries to reveal the truth but fails because Srishti locks Pooja into the cupboard but however Pooja escapes and she reveals Srishti's true colours in front of the family which makes them shock especially Dhruv and he learns that Srishti had been kidnapped Dhani and Kashinath and he saves both of them from the trap and he blames Srishti for trying to separate them and he reconciles with Dhani which angers Srishti and tries to kill her but fails when Srishti falls on the floor, injuring her forehead and is hospitalized and is arrested. Srishti, escapes from the hospital and she threats Dhruv and he learns that Srishti had escaped from the hospital, frightening Dhani so she tries to flee, but fails when Srishti enters the house and she beats Dhani with the Steel Rod while Dhruv tries to stop her but he is beaten by Srishti itself and she kidnaps her and she brings her into the building and tries to throw her but however, Dhruv saves Dhani from Srishti but Dhruv is killed by Srishti with the Steel Rod and she throws him to the cliff which makes the shock for Dhani and Dhruv's family and Dhani blames Srishti for Dhruv's death and Srishti is arrested and imprisoned while the entire family blames Dhani for the death of Dhruv which turns her to become as his widower.

One day, Dhani accidentally meets a man named Deva, a singer who is the Doppelganger of Dhruv and also a mechanic where she mets at the road accident which she hugs Deva thinking that he is Dhruv. Deva tries to stay away from Dhani but Deva knows Dhani's husband death and aftermath he decided to help her. When Deva comes inside his house the family is shocked to see Deva thinking that he is Dhruv, Abhishek doubts Deva's behaviour and tries to investigate him. In the end, the truth of Deva is revealed. At the behest of Kashinath Pandey, he stops at Dhani's house. The police come to the house and give Dhruv's ashes and say that the villagers found Dhruv's body, but after a long time, the villagers took the last corpse. This upsets the family. Dhruv comes to the house in the form of a spirit. He tries to talk to everyone but is unable to. No one can see him. Only Deva knows by seeing the soul of Dhruv. On that side Abhishek and Bua get greedy for property. For this Abhishek forcibly signs with Kashinath Pandey. Then Deva comes in their midst, then Abhishek attacks Deva with a powder in his stomach. Then Dhruv comes in Deva's body and everyone is shocked. Abhishek goes to the tantrik to confine Dhruv's soul, where Dhruv's spirit comes. Dhruv's spirit saves Abhishek from trouble and Dhruv is freed by giving Dhani's hand to Deva.

20 Years Later
The story leaps to 20 years later where Dhani, Deva, Abhishek and Pooja are revealed to dead and it shifts to a new character named Devyani Tripathi, Deva and Dhani's daughter and the look-alike of Dhani had grown up. Who lives with Kashinath and their family. Rudra Pratap Srivastava, who is a rich and handsome businessman and the son of Yashoda Shrivastava. Tara who is Abhishek and Pooja's daughter and Devyani's sister-in-law across her by Devayani in her marriage with Rajveer. Rudra marry Devyani as Revenge to her. Rudra comes Pandey house to bride farewell of Devyani.

Yashoda tries to kill Dhaani multiple times but she was saved by Rudra itself. Rudra and Devyani became friends and fall in love with each other.

Dhaka I try to protect her husband from writhing so she doesn’t take him way for. Shank. But, all Doritos rent fed is tarn sfirisu is one that brought him out and saved him all the time.

Cast 
 Megha Ray as
Dhani Chaubey / Dhani Dhruv Pandey / Dhani Deva Tripathi: Surendra and Phooli's daughter, Srishti's younger sister, Dhruv's widow and Deva's wife; Devyani's mother, Rudra's mother-in-law (2022) (Dead)
 Devyani Tripathi / Devyani Rudra Pratap Srivastava: Rudra Pratap's wife, Deva and Dhani's daughter, Yashoda's step daughter-in-law and Khushi's stepmother (2022)
 Karam Rajpal as
 Dhruv Pandey: Kashinath and Roopa's youngest son, Rocky and Abhishek's youngest brother, Dhani's first husband and Srishti's ex-husband Deva's biological brother; Surendra and Phooli's son-in-law (2022) (Dead)
 Deva Tripathi: Anjan and Pavan's son Mahaveer's step son, Dimple, Aarav and Badal's brother; Dhruv's biological brother; Dhani's husband, Devyani's father, Rudra's father-in-law, Surendra and Phooli's son-in-law (2022) (Dead)
 Ketaki Kadam as Srishti Chaubey / Srishti Dhruv Pandey: Dhani's elder sister Rocky's ex-fiance and Dhruv's ex-wife and murderer (2022)
 Angad Hasija as Rudra Pratap Srivastava: Devyani's husband, Khushi's father, Yashoda's step son, Rajveer's step brother, Deva and Dhani's son-in-law (2022)
 Sudesh Berry as Kashinath Pandey: Dhruv, Abhishek and Rocky's father; Roopa's husband, Deva's uncle Devyani and Tara's grandfather and Rudra and Rajveer's grandfather-in-law (2022)
 Shrashti Maheshwari as Tara Pandey/ Tara Rajveer Pratap Srivastava: Abhishek and Pooja's daughter, Rajveer's wife (2022)
 Reyannsh Vir Chadha as Rajveer Pratap Srivastava: Tara's husband, Rudra Pratap's step brother and Yashoda's son (2022)
 Anita Kulkarni as Yashoda Srivastava: Rudra's step mother, Rajveer's mother, Devyani and Tara's mother-in-law and Khushi's step grandmother (2022)
 Urvashi Upadhyay as Roopa Kashinath Pandey: Kashinath's wife and Dhruv, Abhishek and Rocky's mother, Devyani and Tara's grandmother and Rudra and Rajveer's grandmother-in-law (2022)
 Meena Mir as Geeta Pandey a.k.a Bua ji: Sanskriti's mother (2022)
 Udit Shukla as Abhishek Pandey: Kashinath and Roopa's elder son; Dhruv and Rocky's elder brother; Pooja's husband; Tara's father and Rajveer's father-in-law (2022) (Dead)
 Diksha Dhami as Pooja Abhishek Pandey: Abhishek's wife; Dhruv and Rocky's sister-in-law; Tara's mother and Rajveer's mother-in-law (2022) (Dead)
 Chetanya Adib as Surendra Chaubey: Srishti and Dhani's father; Phooli's husband Devyani's grandfather, Dhruv and Deva's father-in-law (2022)
 Hemaakshi Ujjain as Phooli Surendra Chaubey: Srishti and Dhani's mother; Surendra's wife Devyani's grandmother, Dhruv and Deva's mother-in-law (2022)
 Tanishq Seth as Sanskriti, Bua ji's daughter (2022) 
 Inderjeet Modi as Bua ji's son, Sanskriti's Brother (2022)
 Iqra Sheikh as Vaani Shandilya: Bhanupratap and Gayathri's daughter 
 Jaya Ojha as Meena Singh
 Satya Tiwari as Rocky Pandey: Kashinath and Roopa's second son, Dhruv and Abhishek's second brother, Srishti's ex fiance (2022)(Dead) 
 Shyn Khurana as Maya: Rudra's former classmate and obsessive lover, Vengeful spirit, Devyani's rival (2022)(Dead)

References
 

2022 Indian television series debuts
Indian drama television series
Hindi-language television shows
Television shows set in Uttar Pradesh
Dangal TV original programming